Erol Dost (Bulgarian: Ерол Дост; born 30 May 1999) is a Bulgarian professional footballer who plays as a midfielder for Slavia Sofia .

Career

Ludogorets Razgrad
Dost begin his career in Lokomotiv Plovdiv before moving to Ludogorets Razgrad Academy in 2015. Dost played in 5 of the matches in UEFA Youth League group stage for the U19 team in 2016.

On 27 May 2017 he made his debut for Ludogorets II in a match against Spartak Pleven. He was promoted to the first team in the summer of 2017 and joined the first team camp. Dost completed his debut for the first team on 5 August 2017 in a match against Vitosha Bistritsa, coming on as a substitute in the added time of the second half. He scored his first goal for Ludogorets on 20 May 2018 in the last league match for the season against Botev Plovdiv.

Slavia Sofia

In the end of December 2020 Dost terminated his contract with Ludogorets Razgrad by mutual agreement to sign a week later with Slavia Sofia.

Career statistics

Club

References

External links
 

1999 births
Living people
Bulgarian footballers
Bulgaria youth international footballers
First Professional Football League (Bulgaria) players
Second Professional Football League (Bulgaria) players
PFC Ludogorets Razgrad II players
PFC Ludogorets Razgrad players
SFC Etar Veliko Tarnovo players
SK Slavia Prague players
Association football midfielders
Sportspeople from Pazardzhik